Fenioux is a commune in the Deux-Sèvres department in the Nouvelle-Aquitaine region in western France. The romanesque church of Saint-Pierre was built in the 12th century.

See also
 Communes of the Deux-Sèvres department

References

Communes of Deux-Sèvres